"It's You" is a song by American–Canadian DJ duo Duck Sauce. The song was released as a single on June 25, 2013. A music video was uploaded to the duo's Vevo channel on YouTube on the same day. A slightly altered and longer version of the song was later featured on the duo's debut studio album Quack. The song has peaked at number 46 on the Belgian Flanders Tip singles chart, number 19 on the Belgian Wallonia Tip singles chart, and number 47 on the French Singles Chart. The song samples "It's You" by Bruce Patch.

Music video
The official music video for the song was uploaded on June 25, 2013, to the duo's Vevo channel on YouTube. The video takes place in a barbershop and is simply centered around the happenings of the barbershop. Chris Martins of Spin states that the video, "begins mundanely enough, with our musical hosts behind the clippers, trimming the ‘dos of various customers. But as the beat picks up, the hair begins to move with the rhythm — eyeballs, too, and soon the entire salon transforms. Eventually a disco ball emerges from a sizable Afro, black-light head designs are revealed, and rising foam envelops the clientele." The video received a nomination under the Best Visual Effects category at the 2013 MTV Video Music Awards, but it eventually lost to "Safe and Sound" by Capital Cities.

Track listing

Digital download

Remixes

Charts

Weekly charts

Year-end charts

Release history

References

2013 singles
2013 songs
Duck Sauce songs
House music songs
Songs written by Armand Van Helden
Music videos directed by Philip Andelman